The 2011–2012 Israeli Basketball Super League was the 58th season of the top basketball league in Israel. The season began on 16 October 2011 and ended on 24 May 2012.

Maccai Tel Aviv won the championship title for the 50th time.

Format

Each of the 11 participating teams play 20 regular league games, one home game and one away game against each other team. After that, there is 3rd round in which every team play against each other team once. The top eight teams advance to the playoff, where they play best-of-5 series decided by the rankings at the end of the regular season (first against eighth, second against seventh and so on). The series winners play in the Final Four to determine the championship.
The two 9th and 10th ranked teams compete in a best-of-5 series relegation playoff, and the loser will be relegated to Liga Leumit 2012–2013.

Team information

Stadia and locations

Head coaches

Regular season

Pld – Played; W – Won; L – Lost; PF – Points for; PA – Points against; Diff – Difference; Pts – Points.

Rounds 1-2

The home team is listed on the left-hand column.The rightmost column and the bottom row list the teams' home and away records respectively.

Playoffs
The Quarter Finals were played as The-Best-of-5 series, while the Semifinals and the final were 1 match stages.

Stats Leaders
''

Efficiency

Points

Rebounds

Assists

All-Star Game
The 2012 Israeli League All-star event was held on March 8, 2012, at the Ashkelon Sports Arena.

Three-point shootout

Slam Dunk Contest

Awards

Regular season MVP

 Lior Eliyahu (Maccabi Tel Aviv)

All-BSL 1st team
 Moran Roth (Hapoel Holon)
 Derwin Kitchen (Maccabi Rishon LeZion)
 Josh Carter (Maccabi Ashdod)
 Lior Eliyahu (Maccabi Tel Aviv)
 Bryant Dunston (Hapoel Holon)

Coach of the season
 Ofer Berkovich (Maccabi Ashdod)

Rising star
 Ezequiel Skverer (Habik'a B.C.)

Best Defender
 Nitzan Hanochi (Maccabi Rishon LeZion)

Most Improved Player
 Sean Daniel (Hapoel Holon)

Sixth Man of the Season
 Alex Tyus (Maccabi Ashdod)

Player of the Week

Month Awards

See also
Israeli Basketball League Cup 2012
Israeli Basketball League Cup 2011

References

External links
IBA's official website (Hebrew)

Israeli Basketball Premier League seasons
Israeli
Basketball